Parviz Ghelichkhani (born 4 December 1945) is an Iranian-French retired football player and former captain of Iran national football team. He is now based in France, where he is the editor and publisher of a political magazine.

Football career

Club career
He played for Alborz F.C. (Kyan's reserve team), Kian F.C., Taj, Pas F.C., Oghab F.C., Daraei F.C. and finally Persepolis F.C., before leaving for the United States where he played for the San Jose Earthquakes in the North American Soccer League.

Ghelichkhani won many national titles, among them the Iranian league in 1971; he could also achieve the runners-up position with Persepolis F.C. in 1977. In 1970, he won the Asian Club Championship. During various stages of his career, he had offers from German, Greek and Turkish football clubs but declined all of them.

International career

Ghelichkhani made his debut for the Iranian national team in the 1964 Summer Olympics match against East Germany. Aged 19, Ghelichkhani was the youngest Iranian player at those Games. Later he was Iran's captain at 1972 and 1976 Summer Olympics.

Ghelichkhani won the Asian Nations Cup three consecutive times with Iran, in 1968 (where he scored the 2–1 victory goal), in 1972, and in 1976, when he captained the team. In 1966 he won the silver medal of the Asian Games in Thailand, in 1974 he captained the Iranian team to win the football tournament of the Asian Games in Tehran.

His last game for Iran was a friendly match against Hungary in March 1977. He scored 12 goals for Iran and has 64 caps for Team Melli. One of his most memorable goals was in a 1974 World Cup qualification match against Australia, in a 2–0 win in Tehran.

For the 1978 season, Ghelichkhani moved to the United States to play for the San Jose Earthquakes, then part of the North American Soccer League. During this time, Ghelichkhani retained his number 5 jersey and was credited only by his first name.

Career statistics

International goals

Political career
Ghelichkhani was also politically involved and had leftist leanings. He was arrested by SAVAK in February 1972, but was released after two months. He was opposed to the Pahlavi regime and the system that was put in place after the Iranian revolution. He missed out on World Cup 1978 because of his opposition to the regime.

Due to his political activities before and after the revolution, he eventually left the country to live in Paris, France.

Between 1991 and 2014, Ghelichkhani was the editor of Arash, a political and cultural commentary magazine concentrating mainly on Iranian issues, which was published in France.

Parviz Ghelichkhani was honored in December 2007 in Sydney, Australia, in celebration of the 100th edition of Arash magazine, in a ceremony where Ralé Rašić was a guest speaker. Rašić was Australia's coach when Australia faced Iran twice during the 1974 World Cup qualification games.

References

External links

 Ghelichkhani at TeamMelli.com
Arash Magazine 

NASL stats

1945 births
Iranian footballers
Iran international footballers
Association football midfielders
Esteghlal F.C. players
Pas players
Persepolis F.C. players
Olympic footballers of Iran
Footballers at the 1964 Summer Olympics
Footballers at the 1972 Summer Olympics
Footballers at the 1976 Summer Olympics
1968 AFC Asian Cup players
1972 AFC Asian Cup players
1976 AFC Asian Cup players
AFC Asian Cup-winning players
North American Soccer League (1968–1984) players
San Jose Earthquakes (1974–1988) players
Expatriate soccer players in the United States
Iranian expatriate footballers
People from Tehran
French people of Azerbaijani descent
Iranian journalists
Iranian activists
Iranian dissidents
Magazine publishers (people)
Exiles of the Iranian Revolution in France
Living people
Persepolis F.C. managers
Asian Games gold medalists for Iran
Asian Games silver medalists for Iran
Asian Games medalists in football
Footballers at the 1966 Asian Games
Footballers at the 1970 Asian Games
Footballers at the 1974 Asian Games
Iranian emigrants to France
Medalists at the 1966 Asian Games
Iranian football managers